Nicholas Frederick Chilton is an Australian chemist and a Professor in the Department of Chemistry at the University of Manchester. His research is in the areas of magnetochemistry and computational chemistry, and includes the design of high-temperature single molecule magnets, molecular spin qubits for quantum information science, methods and tools for modelling magnetic calculations.

Education 
Chilton completed his Advanced Bachelor of Science (Honors) degree at Monash University in 2011 where he finished his final year project with Stuart R. Batten and Keith S. Murray. His research at Monash included the synthesis and characterization of low-symmetry dysprosium complexes, and mixed-metallic lanthanide-transition metal clusters, that display single molecule magnetism. During this time, he also designed a software program, PHI, for the calculation of the magnetic properties of paramagnetic coordination complexes. Chilton completed his Ph.D. on magnetochemistry at the University of Manchester, supervised by Richard Winpenny and Eric McInnes in 2015. In 2021, he was promoted to Professor in Computational and theoretical chemistry.

Research and career 
Chilton completed postdoctoral research at the Engineering and Physical Sciences Research Council National EPR facility in collaboration with the University of Manchester. In 2016, he was awarded the British Ramsay Memorial Fellowship (2016–2018) to research how coordination chemistry can be used to engineer specific magnetic states of lanthanide ions. From 2017, He began work as a Senior Lecturer and a Royal Society University Research Fellow in the Department of Chemistry at the University of Manchester.

Chilton's research is in the areas of computational chemistry and magnetochemistry, specifically on the design of high-temperature single molecule magnets, molecular spin qubits for quantum information science, understanding paramagnetic MRI contrast agents, unravelling the electronic structure of uranium coordination complexes, magnetic interactions between f-elements and in developing methods and tools for modelling magnetic calculations.

Notable work 

In 2017, with synthetic chemist David P. Mills, Chilton led the magnetic characterization of a dysprosocenium ion single-molecule magnet, which exhibits magnetic hysteresis at 60 Kelvin.

Chilton has also collaborated in developing software to be used in chemical research, particularly in modelling magnetic relaxation and magnetic properties of coordination complexes. In 2013, with Alessandro Soncini he designed a computer program for the determination of the orientation of the magnetic anisotropy of the mJ = ±15/2 state of DyIII via electrostatic optimization of the aspherical electron density distribution. He also designed a program named PHI for the calculation of the magnetic properties of paramagnetic coordination complexes in the same year. In 2019, with his post-doctoral researcher Daniel Reta, designed CC-FIT2, a tool for the fitting of experimental AC magnetic susceptibility data using the (generalized) Debye model, extraction of magnetic relaxation times with associated uncertainties, and fitting the temperature dependence of these data accounting for uncertainties in the underlying relaxation times.

Awards, honours and nominations 
 2019: Royal Society University Research Fellowship
 2019: Olivier Kahn International Award 
 2016: British Ramsay Memorial Fellowship  
 2015 Dalton Young Researchers Award

Publications

His major publications include:

References

Living people
Australian chemists
Academics of the University of Manchester
21st-century chemists
Monash University alumni
Place of birth missing (living people)
Date of birth missing (living people)
Year of birth missing (living people)